The men's featherweight (57 kg/125.4 lbs) Thai-Boxing division at the W.A.K.O. European Championships 2006 in Skopje was the third lightest of the male Thai-Boxing tournaments and involved only four fighters.  Each of the matches was three rounds of two minutes each and were fought under Thai-Boxing rules.

The tournament was won by Serbian Aleksandar Gogic who defeated Ruben Almedia from Portugal in the final by split decision to claim gold.  Defeated semi finalists Ramil Novruzov from Belarus and Ilya Mordvinov from Russia took the bronze medal positions.

Results

Key

See also
List of WAKO Amateur European Championships
List of WAKO Amateur World Championships
List of male kickboxers

References

External links
 WAKO World Association of Kickboxing Organizations Official Site

W.A.K.O. European Championships 2006 (Skopje)